Recep İvedik 3 It is the sequel to Recep İvedik 2, starring Şahan Gökbakar, which was released on February 12, 2010. Faruk Aksoy undertook the production of the film directed by Togan Gökbakar.

Storyline
Recep Ivedik has been depressed since the death of his grandmother. Everyone who tries to help him fails. A young girl named Zeynep, who can't find an apartment, stays with Recep. Initially, the two can't stand each others but after a while, they grow close. Despite many adventures together, Recep's depression won't go away.

Cast

 Şahan Gökbakar as Recep İvedik
 Zeynep Çamcı as Zeynep

Sequels

External links 
  for the film (Turkish)
 
 

2010 films
2010 comedy films
Turkish sequel films
Films set in Istanbul
Films set in Turkey
Turkish comedy films
2010s Turkish-language films
Films directed by Togan Gökbakar